Morongo Valley is a census-designated place (CDP) on State Route 62 in San Bernardino County, California, United States. The population was 3,552 at the 2010 census, up from 1,929 at the 2000 census. The town is bordered by Yucca Valley, California.

Geography and climate

Morongo Valley lies along the western edge of the Mojave Desert and near the northern edge of the Coachella Valley, and as such is generally dry. Monsoonal moisture leads to thunderstorms at times during the summer, but in the winter, Pacific storms bring most of the rain.

Demographics

2010
At the 2010 census Morongo Valley had a population of 3,552. The racial makeup of Morongo Valley was 3,076 (86.6%) White (79.1% Non-Hispanic White), 40 (1.1%) African American, 73 (2.1%) Native American, 31 (0.9%) Asian, 4 (0.1%) Pacific Islander, 187 (5.3%) from other races, and 141 (4.0%) from two or more races. Hispanic or Latino of any race were 531 people (14.9%).

The census reported that 3,547 people (99.9% of the population) lived in households, 5 (0.1%) lived in non-institutionalized group quarters, and no one was institutionalized.

There were 1,602 households, 359 (22.4%) had children under the age of 18 living in them, 598 (37.3%) were opposite-sex married couples living together, 178 (11.1%) had a female householder with no husband present, 99 (6.2%) had a male householder with no wife present.  There were 132 (8.2%) unmarried opposite-sex partnerships, and 26 (1.6%) same-sex married couples or partnerships. 554 households (34.6%) were one person and 203 (12.7%) had someone living alone who was 65 or older. The average household size was 2.21.  There were 875 families (54.6% of households); the average family size was 2.87.

The age distribution was 646 people (18.2%) under the age of 18, 266 people (7.5%) aged 18 to 24, 745 people (21.0%) aged 25 to 44, 1,346 people (37.9%) aged 45 to 64, and 549 people (15.5%) who were 65 or older.  The median age was 47.2 years. For every 100 females, there were 105.6 males.  For every 100 females age 18 and over, there were 106.0 males.

There were 2,004 housing units at an average density of 79.5 per square mile, of the occupied units 1,159 (72.3%) were owner-occupied and 443 (27.7%) were rented. The homeowner vacancy rate was 4.7%; the rental vacancy rate was 7.9%.  2,489 people (70.1% of the population) lived in owner-occupied housing units and 1,058 people (29.8%) lived in rental housing units.

According to the 2010 United States Census, Morongo Valley had a median household income of $32,337, with 25.3% of the population living below the federal poverty line.

2000
At the 2000 census there were 1,929 people, 811 households, and 473 families in the CDP. The population density was 249.5 inhabitants per square mile (96.4/km). The racial makeup of the CDP was 91.9% White, 0.8% African American, 1.4% Native American, 0.4% Asian, 0.1% Pacific Islander, 3.4% from other races, and 2.1% from two or more races. Hispanic or Latino of any race were 9.3%.

Of the 811 households 26.5% had children under the age of 18 living with them, 43.9% were married couples living together, 10.2% had a female householder with no husband present, and 41.6% were non-families. 33.7% of households were one person and 11.8% were one person aged 65 or older.  The average household size was 2.37 and the average family size was 3.04.

The age distribution was 25.2% under the age of 18, 6.3% from 18 to 24, 25.6% from 25 to 44, 27.8% from 45 to 64, and 15.1% 65 or older.  The median age was 41 years. For every 100 females, there were 100.1 males.  For every 100 females age 18 and over, there were 101.3 males.

The median household income was $36,357 and the median family income  was $36,643. Males had a median income of $37,091 versus $26,528 for females. The per capita income for the CDP was $19,624.  About 12.2% of families and 19.4% of the population were below the poverty line, including 28.7% of those under age 18 and 19.0% of those age 65 or over.

Infrastructure

Local
Morongo Valley is unincorporated and is under the jurisdiction of San Bernardino County; it lies immediately north of the Riverside County line. A popular destination in Morongo Valley is the Big Morongo Canyon Preserve, where one can take hikes, go bird-watching or stroll along the walkways. The governing body of Morongo Valley is the Community Services District (CSD), which has five board members. The only school in Morongo Valley is Morongo Valley Elementary School (MVES), which is part of the Morongo Unified School District. MVES has an enrollment of a few hundred students.

State and federal representation

Paradise Fire
In June 2005, a fire started on Paradise Avenue in western Morongo Valley. This fire quickly spread, torching about six thousand acres (24 km). The fire burned seven homes and also damaged some of the walkways in the Big Morongo Canyon Preserve. All damage has since been repaired and the preserve remains open for birding and hiking.

Sawtooth Complex Fire

In July 2006, a fire started by dry lightning in Yucca Valley was almost 100 percent contained, however due to extremely low humidity, high temperatures, and  gusts, the fire grew. The fire quickly spread from Yucca Valley through Pioneertown and Big Morongo. In fact, another small fire dubbed the Millard Complex fire merged with the Sawtooth Complex fire. Well over 100 structures were burned in the two fires, although virtually no damage occurred in Morongo Valley itself.

Notable residents
 President of Focus on the Family Jim Daly has stated that he lived in foster care here for a period as a child immediately following the death of his mother, and that he attended Morongo Valley Elementary School
 Professional downhill mountain biker Aaron Gwin was born here.
 Native American actor Steve Reevis resided here.
 Country music singer Leah Turner is originally from here.
 Musician Gene Parsons was born here.

References

External links

 Morongo Valley Web Site
 Big Morongo Canyon Preserve
 

Census-designated places in San Bernardino County, California
Census-designated places in California